The 1988 NBA Finals was the championship round of the National Basketball Association (NBA)'s 1987–88 season, and the culmination of the season's playoffs. The Western Conference champion Los Angeles Lakers defeated the Eastern Conference champion Detroit Pistons 4 games to 3.

One of Los Angeles Lakers head coach Pat Riley's most famous moments came when he promised the crowd a repeat championship during the Lakers' 1987 championship parade in downtown Los Angeles. With every team in the league now gunning for them, the Los Angeles Lakers still found a way to win, taking their seventh consecutive Pacific Division title. While the 1988 Lakers did not produce as many wins in the regular season as the 1987 Lakers, they were just as successful in the playoffs, becoming the first team in 19 years to repeat as champions.

One of Pistons guard Isiah Thomas's career-defining performances came in Game 6. Despite badly twisting his ankle midway through the period, Thomas scored an NBA Finals record 25 third-quarter points, as Detroit fell valiantly, 103–102, to the Lakers at the Forum.

Thomas still managed to score 10 first-half points in Game 7, as Detroit built a 5-point lead. In the 3rd quarter, the Lakers, inspired by Finals MVP James Worthy and Byron Scott (14 3rd-quarter points), exploded as they built a 10-point lead entering the final period. The lead swelled to 15 before Detroit mounted a furious 4th-quarter rally, trimming the lead to two points on several occasions.  The Lakers ultimately prevailed and captured their 5th championship in the last 9 seasons.

This was the first NBA Finals since 1983 not to feature the Boston Celtics.

Background

Los Angeles Lakers

During the 1987 championship parade in Los Angeles, Lakers coach Pat Riley guaranteed a repeat championship, a feat that had not been achieved since the Boston Celtics won the 1969 NBA Finals. Motivated by their coach's boast, the Lakers once again earned the league's best record in the 1987–88 season (62–20), despite winning three games less than the previous year. They also had a 15-game winning streak from December 11, 1987 until the Lakers were beaten by the LA Clippers (109-110) on January 13, 1988. They also had another double-digit winning streak (10-game winning streak) from February 11 until February 28. 

The playoffs proved to be a difficult climb for the Lakers, however. They swept the San Antonio Spurs in the first round. They came back from a 2–1 deficit against the Utah Jazz in the semifinals round before beating them in Game 7. They then defeated the Dallas Mavericks in 7 games in the Conference Finals round. The Lakers eventually prevailed in both series thanks to their championship experience.

Detroit Pistons

The Pistons of head coach Chuck Daly were an up-and-coming team that gradually moved up the Eastern Conference ranks. Known as the "Bad Boys" for their physical and defensive-minded style of play, the Pistons' core featured guards Isiah Thomas and Joe Dumars, forwards Adrian Dantley and Rick Mahorn, center Bill Laimbeer, and bench players Vinnie Johnson, Dennis Rodman and John Salley. Midway through the season, Detroit gained a valuable backup to Laimbeer and Mahorn when they acquired James Edwards.

The 1987–88 season marked a further ascension for the franchise, as Detroit won the Central Division title with a 54–28 record. The second-seeded Pistons overcame the Washington Bullets and the Chicago Bulls in five games each, before facing the Boston Celtics once again in the conference finals. This time, the Pistons were the better team, eliminating the Celtics in six games for their first NBA Finals appearance since .

Road to the Finals

Regular season series
The Los Angeles Lakers won both games in the regular season series:

Series summary

Game 1

The Pistons had just dispatched the Celtics in six games, while the Lakers were coming off back-to-back seven-game wins over the Utah Jazz and Dallas Mavericks. The Lakers were tired, and it showed. Adrian Dantley scored 34 points, hitting 14 of 16 shots from the field. The Pistons took control of the game with four seconds left in the first half when Bill Laimbeer hit a three-point shot to put the Pistons up 54–40. Isiah Thomas then stole Kareem's inbound pass at half court and let fly with another three-pointer which hit nothing but net at the halftime buzzer. The Pistons had a 57-40 halftime lead and never looked back, stealing Game 1 with a 105–93 win.

Game 2

Facing the possibility of going down 2–0 with three games to play in Detroit, the veteran Lakers found resolve with a 108–96 win. James Worthy led the Lakers with 26 points, Byron Scott had 24, and Magic Johnson 23 despite battling the flu.

Game 3

With Magic still battling the flu, the Lakers got a key win in Detroit, 99–86, to go up 2–1 in games. The Lakers took control of the game in the third period, outscoring the Pistons 31–18. Despite his illness, Magic had 18 points, 14 assists, and six rebounds.

Game 4

In front of their home fans, the Pistons tied the series at 2–2 with a 111–86 win. The Pistons decided to attack the basket and make Magic Johnson defend. Johnson wound up on the bench early in the second half with foul trouble.

With Magic out of the game, the Pistons built a substantial lead. During timeouts, Bill Laimbeer was almost frantic. He kept saying, "No letup! We don't let up!" They didn't, and blew out the defending NBA champions by 25 points.

Left open by the trapping Lakers defense, Dantley led the team with 27 points. Vinnie Johnson came off the bench to add 16 while James Edwards had 14 points and five rebounds off the bench.

Game 5

The Pistons' 104–94 victory was a perfect farewell to the Pontiac Silverdome. Bill Laimbeer told Joe Dumars with a minute left in the game to "look around and enjoy this because you'll never see anything like it again". He went on to say, "Forty-one thousand people waving towels and standing. It was awesome."

The Lakers opened Game 5 with a fury of physical intimidation, scoring the game's first 12 points. But that approach soon backfired, as the Laker big men got into foul trouble.

Dantley played a major role in the turnaround, scoring 25 points, 19 of them in the first half, to rally the Pistons to a 59-50 halftime lead. Vinnie Johnson added 12 of his 16 points in the first half to keep Detroit moving.

Joe Dumars added 19 points on 9-of-13 shooting to send the Pistons back to Los Angeles, one win away from their first NBA title.

Games 3, 4, and 5 were the last NBA Finals games to be contested in a domed stadium built primarily for football until the 1999 NBA Finals in which Games 1 and 2 were played at the Alamodome in San Antonio. The Pistons left the Pontiac Silverdome after the 1987–88 season and moved into The Palace of Auburn Hills for the 1988-89 NBA season.

Game 6
 
The Lakers led 56–48 in the third quarter when Isiah Thomas suddenly began a classic performance. He scored his team's next 14 points, hitting two free throws, a driving layup, four jump shots, and a running bank shot.

With a little less than 5 minutes left in the period and the score 70–64, Lakers, Thomas rolled his right ankle while passing off to Joe Dumars for a basket. Thomas tried to run upcourt, but collapsed while the Lakers scored again. Despite a severe sprain, Thomas returned to the game with 3:44 left and the Lakers up 74–66. Thomas, with his bad ankle, scored 11 of the Pistons' last 15 points of the quarter to finish with 25, an NBA Finals record for one quarter, on 11-of-13 shooting. During this time, the Pistons outscored the Lakers 15–5 to take an 81–79 lead.

The fourth quarter was nip-and-tuck; with 1:30 left, Thomas, sore ankle and all, hit a baseline jumper for his 42nd and 43rd points to give the Pistons a 100–99 lead. The Lakers came down and Magic Johnson got the ball inside to James Worthy, but his layup attempt was blocked by Dennis Rodman. Joe Dumars penetrated inside on the ensuing possession, was fouled, and hit the two free throws for a three-point lead at 102–99 with a minute left.

The Lakers called timeout, and on the next possession, Byron Scott drove by Thomas from the top of the key and hit a 14-footer from the right elbow to cut the lead to one with 45 seconds left. Thomas then missed another baseline jumper and Worthy rebounded with 27 seconds remaining. The Lakers then set up and Scott got it to Kareem Abdul-Jabbar, who drew a foul on Bill Laimbeer (his sixth) as he wheeled for a skyhook on the right baseline with 14 seconds left. This foul has remained controversial to the Pistons and their fans, who claim that Laimbeer never made contact with Jabbar on his shot attempt. Abdul-Jabbar then proceeded to sink two high-pressure free throws providing the Lakers with a one point lead.

After a time out, the Pistons set up for a final shot. Thomas collided with Dantley after inbounding the ball, but Dumars penetrated in the paint and put up a shot that missed after he was forced to by A.C. Green to alter it. After a scramble, Scott came up with the ball for the Lakers and was shoved out of bounds by Rodman, inciting a near-fight, with 5 seconds left on the clock. Scott missed both free throw attempts, but the Pistons, who had no timeouts remaining, lost precious seconds trying to secure the loose rebound and could not get a shot off before time expired.

Thomas would end up with 43 points and eight assists in a heroic performance.

Game 7

In the final game, Thomas' ankle was still sore, as evidenced by his limping badly in warm-ups. He did manage to play the first half, scoring 10 points and leading the Pistons to a 52-47 halftime lead. But, the delay between halves caused the ankle to stiffen, and Thomas played little in the second half. With Isiah on the bench, the Lakers turned the halftime deficit into a 90–75 lead early in the 4th quarter. A key factor was Laker guard Michael Cooper; he had been mired in a terrible shooting slump all series, but suddenly caught fire, hitting three 3-point baskets.

Chuck Daly then went to a faster lineup with Dennis Rodman, John Salley, Joe Dumars, and Vinnie Johnson that created matchup problems for the Lakers and enabled the Pistons to score at a torrid pace. With 3:54 left, Salley canned two free throws to cut the Laker lead to 98–92, making the Forum fans nervous.

With 1:17 left, Dumars hit a jump shot to cut the lead to 102–100. Magic Johnson then hit a free throw after a Rodman foul to put the Lakers up by three. After the two teams exchanged turnovers, Rodman took an ill-advised jumper with 40 seconds left. Byron Scott rebounded and was fouled. His two free throws pushed the lead to 105–100. After another Pistons' turnover, Michael Cooper had a chance to essentially clinch the victory after being fouled, but he missed both free throws, and the Lakers' lead remained at five.

After Dumars made a layup, James Worthy hit a free throw and Bill Laimbeer canned a 28-foot three-pointer, pushing the score to 106–105 with six seconds showing. A. C. Green completed the scoring with a layup off a length-of-the court pass from Magic, making it 108–105. Laimbeer made a long desperate pass to Thomas who caught the ball trying to shoot a three to send the game to overtime, but Thomas fell to the floor in a collision with Johnson, losing the ball as time ran out. Fans were already beginning to storm onto the floor even though time had not expired, but the officials ignored this. Pat Riley and the Laker players hurried back to their dressing room as the players and coaches on both teams were pummeled by the storming fans.

Worthy racked up a monster triple-double: 36 points, 16 rebounds and 10 assists. It would prove to be the only triple-double in Worthy's Hall of Fame career. For that and his earlier efforts in the series, he was named the Finals MVP, cementing his nickname "Big Game James".

Michael Cooper, Magic Johnson and Kareem Abdul-Jabbar are the only members of all 5 Lakers championship teams from the 1980s. Pat Riley is the only coach that was on all 5 Lakers championship teams from the 1980s, he was an assistant coach on the 1980 championship team, and head coach on the other four championship teams.

This was the Lakers' first Game 7 Finals victory since 1954; however, it was their first ever Game 7 win in the championship series since moving to Los Angeles in 1960; they were 0–5 in previous Game 7's since moving (1962, 1966, 1969, 1970, 1984). This would end up being the Lakers' last home win in the championship series until 2000.

Team rosters

Los Angeles Lakers

Detroit Pistons

Player statistics

Los Angeles Lakers

|-
| align="left" |  || 7 || 7 || 29.6 || .414 || .000 || .714 || 4.1 || 1.0 || 0.6 || 1.1 || 13.1 
|-
| align="left" |  || 2 || 0 || 7.0 || .667 || .000 || 1.000 || 0.5 || 0.5 || 0.0 || 0.0 || 4.0 
|-
| align="left" |  || 7 || 0 || 25.1 || .205 || .150 || .625 || 1.6 || 2.1 || 0.9 || 0.3 || 3.7 
|-
| align="left" |  || 7 || 7 || 34.6 || .558 || .000 || .733 || 8.7 || 0.6 || 0.4 || 0.0 || 10.0 
|-
| align="left" |  || 7 || 7 || 41.4 || .550 || .333 || .866 || 5.7 || 13.0 || 2.0 || 0.1 || 21.1 
|-
| align="left" |  || 4 || 0 || 2.3 || .333 || .000 || 1.0 || 0.0 || 0.0 || 0.3 || 0.0 || 1.5 
|-
| align="left" |  || 5 || 0 || 6.6 || .667 || .000 || .400 || 1.6 || 0.0 || 0.2 || 0.0 || 1.2 
|-
| align="left" |  || 7 || 7 || 40.1 || .476 || .455 || .771 || 4.9 || 2.0 || 1.0 || 0.4 || 18.9 
|-
| align="left" |  || 2 || 0 || 3.0 || .000 || .000 || .000 || 1.0 || 0.0 || 0.0 || 0.0 || 0.0 
|-
| align="left" |  || 7 || 0 || 21.6 || .500 || .000 || .412 || 3.6 || 0.3 || 0.0 || 0.4 || 7.0 
|-
| align="left" |  || 2 || 0 || 2.5 || .000 || .000 || .000 || 0.0 || 0.5 || 0.0 || 0.0 || 0.0 
|-! style="background:#FDE910;"
| align="left" |  || 7 || 7 || 38.0 || .492 || .000 || .735 || 7.4 || 4.4 || 0.7 || 0.6 || 22.0 

Detroit Pistons

|-
| align="left" |  || 7 || 7 || 36.4 || .573 || .000 || .859 || 5.0 || 2.3 || 0.6 || 0.1 || 21.3 
|-
| align="left" |  || 7 || 7 || 33.3 || .513 || .500 || .929 || 2.3 || 4.6 || 0.6 || 0.0 || 13.4 
|-
| align="left" |  || 7 || 0 || 13.7 || .477 || .000 || .636 || 3.0 || 1.0 || 0.1 || 0.4 || 7.0 
|-
| align="left" |  || 7 || 0 || 23.4 || .405 || .167 || .444 || 3.7 || 3.0 || 0.7 || 0.1 || 11.0 
|-
| align="left" |  || 7 || 7 || 33.6 || .391 || .333 || 1.000 || 8.9 || 1.9 || 0.4 || 1.0 || 9.4 
|-
| align="left" |  || 3 || 0 || 1.3 || .500 || .000 || .000 || 1.0 || 0.0 || 0.0 || 0.0 || 0.7 
|-
| align="left" |  || 7 || 7 || 10.6 || .409 || .000 || .833 || 2.4 || 0.1 || 0.0 || 0.6 || 3.3 
|-
| align="left" |  || 1 || 0 || 1.0 || .500 || .000 || .000 || 2.0 || 0.0 || 0.0 || 0.0 || 2.0 
|-
| align="left" |  || 7 || 0 || 24.9 || .629 || .000 || .524 || 6.9 || 0.6 || 0.9 || 1.0 || 7.9 
|-
| align="left" |  || 3 || 0 || 1.7 || .333 || .000 || 1.000 || 0.0 || 0.0 || 0.0 || 0.0 || 1.3 
|-
| align="left" |  || 7 || 0 || 25.3 || .581 || .000 || .700 || 6.3 || 0.9 || 0.7 || 1.3 || 7.1 
|-
| align="left" |  || 7 || 7 || 37.4 || .426 || .294 || .833 || 4.4 || 9.0 || 2.9 || 0.3 || 19.7

Television coverage
The Detroit Pistons season documentary "Bad Boys", narrated by George Blaha recaps Detroit's run to the Finals and how they garnered the "Bad Boys" moniker while the Los Angeles Lakers documentary "Back To Back", narrated by Chick Hearn recaps the Lakers quest to become the first team since the Bill Russell-led Celtics to achieve NBA championships in consecutive years.

That year, CBS Sports used three sideline reporters which were Pat O'Brien (the Pistons' sideline), Lesley Visser (the Lakers' sideline) and James Brown (both teams). Dick Stockton and Billy Cunningham served as the play-by-play announcer and color analyst respectively. After the season, Cunningham left CBS to join the Miami Heat ownership group, and Hubie Brown was promoted the following season.

See also
 1988 NBA Playoffs

References

External links
NBA History

National Basketball Association Finals
Finals
NBA
NBA
Sports in Pontiac, Michigan
20th century in Los Angeles County, California
NBA Finals
Basketball competitions in Michigan
Basketball competitions in Inglewood, California
NBA Finals
NBA Finals